Mikheyevo is a rural locality (a village) in Yagnitskoye Rural Settlement, Cherepovetsky District, Vologda Oblast, Russia. The population was 35 as of 2002.

Geography 
Petryayevo is the nearest rural locality.

References 

Rural localities in Cherepovetsky District